Rashid Al-Jirbi (born 1961) is an Emirati sprinter. He competed in the men's 400 metres at the 1984 Summer Olympics.

References

1961 births
Living people
Athletes (track and field) at the 1984 Summer Olympics
Emirati male sprinters
Olympic athletes of the United Arab Emirates
Place of birth missing (living people)